Peter Browne  was Dean of Ferns from 1794 until his death on 21 July 1842.

Notes

Alumni of Trinity College Dublin
Deans of Ferns

18th-century births
1842 deaths
Year of birth unknown